Duna SK is a Hungarian football club from Budapest.

History
Under the name Bőripari DSE, Duna SK debuted in the 1950 season of the Hungarian League and finished fifteenth.

Name changes
 1949–1951: Bőripari Dolgozók Sport Egyesülete
 1951–1952: IV. ker. Vörös Lobogó SK
 1952–1957: Vörös Lobogó Duna-cipőgyár
 1996–    : Duna SK

References

External links
 

Football clubs in Hungary
Association football clubs established in 1949
1949 establishments in Hungary